Bagenkop is a town in south Denmark, located in Langeland Municipality on the island of Langeland in Region of Southern Denmark.

Sights
The Hulbjerg Passage Grave (Danish: Hulbjerg Jættestue) is a passage grave located south of Bagenkop. It is eight meters long and dates back to 3300–3200 BCE. The findings from the passage grave are displayed on Langeland's Museum. The passage grave was protected in 1966.

The Fishery House (Danish: Fiskeriets Hus) is a local museum located in Bagenkop. It focuses on the local history, as well as on fishery.

References

Cities and towns in the Region of Southern Denmark
Langeland Municipality